KKN may refer to:
Kirkenes Airport, Høybuktmoen (IATA airport code)
Kirknewton railway station
Kyōran Kazoku Nikki, a Japanese light novel, manga, and 2008 anime series 
Niederaichbach Nuclear Power Plant, a decommissioned HWGC reactor in Bavaria 
Kanda, Kodža i Nebojša, a Serbian rock/reggae band
 "korupsi, kolusi, nepotisme" (corruption, collusion and nepotism) in New Order (Indonesia) governance vernacular